Vila Zelina is a neighborhood located in São Paulo, Brazil, best known for the great number of Eastern European immigrants and their descendants who derive from 14 countries that have settled there in the early twentieth century, alongside being one of the greatest colonies outside Lithuania.
The neighborhood has a great number of Russian, Ukrainian, Bulgarian, Romanian, Hungarian, Lithuanian, 
Latvian, Estonian, Belarusian, Czech, Croatian, Slovenian, Slovakian and Polish immigrants.
In a monthly basis the local neighbors and commercials association named AMOVIZA  organize an open air Eastern European immigrant handcraft and gastronomy fair at Aracati Mirim Street on Sundays. The Eastern European immigrants helped develop Vila Zelina since its foundation on 27 / October / 1927 . Mr. Carlos Corkisko, a Russian immigrant, was one of the key people that helped Vila Zelina during their colonization by Eastern European immigrants. October is Vila Zelina's anniversary which is usually being commemorated in an open air party with typical Eastern European food, folkloric dance and music shows alongside various handcrafts.

Notes

Neighbourhoods in São Paulo
Russian communities